Matthew or Matt Joyce may refer to:
 Matt Joyce (American football) (born 1972), former National Football League offensive lineman
 Matt Joyce (baseball) (born 1984), Major League Baseball outfielder
 Matthew M. Joyce (1877–1956), U.S. federal judge 
 Matthew William Joyce, filmmaker, magazine editor and activist
 Matthew Ingle Joyce (died 1930), British judge